Blatt is a surname. People with the surname include:

 David Blatt (born 1959), Israeli-American basketball player and coach
 Genevieve Blatt (1913–1996), American judge and politician from Pennsylvania
 John M. Blatt (1921–1990), Austrian-born American-Australian-Israeli theoretical physicist
 Josephine Blatt (1869–1923), American strongwoman
 Leah Blatt Glasser (born 1950), American literary critic and scholar
 Melanie Blatt (born 1975), British singer and actress
 Nicolae Blatt (1890–1965), Romanian ophthalmologist, surgeon, and medical researcher
 Rainer Blatt (born 1952), German-Austrian physicist
 Robert Blatt (1921–1994), American alpine skier
 Solomon Blatt Sr. (1895–1986), American politician from South Carolina
 Solomon Blatt Jr. (1921–2016), American federal district judge from South Carolina
 Sidney Blatt (1928–2014), American psychiatry and psychology professor
 Tamir Blatt (born 1997), Israeli basketball player in the Israel Basketball Premier League
 Thomas Blatt (1927–2015), Polish-American writer and speaker, survived Sobibor extermination camp
 Warren Blatt (born 1962), American genealogist and computer engineer

See also
 Blat (disambiguation)

German-language surnames
Jewish surnames